Lessoniaceae are a family of kelp. Species of this family have transition zone with intercalary meristem subdivided so that there are a number of secondary stipes in addition to the primary stipe.

Genera and species
Ecklonia
Ecklonia arborea
Ecklonia cava
Ecklonia kurome
Ecklonia maxima
Ecklonia radiata
Ecklonia stolonifera 
Eckloniopsis
Eckloniopsis radicosa 
Egregia
Egregia menziesii - feather boa
Eisenia
Eisenia arborea - southern sea palm, sea oak
Eisenia bicyclis - arame
Lessonia
Lessonia adamsiae
Lessonia brevifolia
Lessonia corrugata
Lessonia flavicans
Lessonia nigrescens
Lessonia spicata
Lessonia tholiformis
Lessonia trabeculata
Lessonia vadosa
Lessonia variegata

References

 
Brown algae families